Nagina is an Indian Hindi suspense thriller film directed by Ravindra Dave, released in 1951 under Pancholi Productions. The film stars Nutan and Nasir Khan in lead roles. Nutan's performance in it gained her greater recognition. The film became a commercial success. Nutan was aged 15 at the time of its release, and was thus not allowed to attend its premiere as it was certified "A": (restricted for adults) and she was underage.

Plot

When Shreenath's father is accused of murder, he disappears. Twenty years later, he is believed to be dead, and Shreenath attends the crime scene to find out what happened and possibly clear his father's name. There he meets Mukta, a young and beautiful woman, at a mysterious ancient mansion.

Cast

Nutan ... Mukta
Nasir Khan ...	Shreenath (as Nasir)
Bipin Gupta ... Raiji
Hiralalb...	Nihal
Mohana ...	Lily
Goldstein ... Goonga
Gope ... Dixit
Shyamlal ...	Shreenath's father (as Shamlal)
Michael ... Lilly's Father

Music
The soundtrack was composed by Shankar–Jaikishan. The film introduced singer C. H. Atma. Author Bradley Shope noted the soundtrack for its jazzy style. The soundtrack marked the first job by Goan music arranger Sebastian D'Souza, who replaced Sunny Castelino halfway through production. He was noted for his "dance-band arranging skills".

Release and reception

The film did well at the box office and, according to Box Office India, was among the ten highest-grossing Indian films of the year. Its success consolidated Nutan's position as a rising star. Nutan, accompanied by Shammi Kapoor, went to attend the premiere but could not enter the theatre to watch the film as she was underage. According to Amjad Parvez, the film is memorable for Nasir Khan's appearance. Author Ashok Raj noted Khan's work in this film alongside a popular actress as a highlight in his career. A 1964 issue of Film World magazine considered the film one of Nutan's most notable films. Author and film critic Dinesh Raheja considered the film an adults-only film and included it in his list of Nutan's "landmark films". According to The Tribune, Nutan was written off for her frail looks. According to author Jagdish Bhatia, in his book Celebrities: A Comprehensive Biographical Thesaurus of Important Men and Women in India, director Dave "took the cine world with storm" with this film, which, "under his supervision, very suspense subject treated so slickly well photographed".

References

Sources

External links

1951 films
1950s Hindi-language films